John Kettleband (22 July 1801 – 3 April 1834) was an English professional cricketer who played first-class cricket from 1826 to 1832.

Kettleband made nine known appearances for the Nottingham Cricket Club in first-class matches, and all of them were against the Sheffield Cricket Club.

References

1801 births
1834 deaths
English cricketers
English cricketers of 1826 to 1863
Nottingham Cricket Club cricketers
Cricketers from Nottingham